Craig William Cook (born 21 May 1987) is a British speedway rider.

Career
Born in Whitehaven, Cook's speedway career began in 2008. In 2009 Cook won the National League Riders Championship and  three years later won the Premier League Riders' Championship. He rode for Peterborough Panthers in 2010. He moved on to Edinburgh Monarchs, who he rode for in the Premier League between 2011 and 2015, and was part of the Belle Vue Aces team that competed in the Elite League from 2011 until 2018. He finished second in the 2014 British Speedway Championship and the 2015 British Speedway Championship.

His domestic success as also seen him recognised internationally, with appearances in the 2013, 2014, 2015 and 2017 Speedway Grand Prix of Great Britain, and he was a member of the Great Britain team that finished fourth in 2014 Speedway World Cup. In 2017, he became the British Champion.

In 2018, Cook became a full-time member of the Speedway Grand Series after being given a qualification position after he had finished fourth in the Speedway Grand Prix Challenge Final. This was due to Patryk Dudek, who finished third in the SGP Challenge Final meeting, and also finishing second in the 2017 Speedway Grand Prix Series.

Cook joined Glasgow Tigers in the SGB Championship in 2018 and would stay with them until 2022. In 2019, he left Peterborough to join the King's Lynn Stars and enjoyed a good season, finishing sixth in the SGB Premiership 2019 averages.

In 2021, he rode in the top tier of British Speedway, riding for the King's Lynn Stars in the SGB Premiership 2021. In 2022, he rode for the Sheffield Tigers in the SGB Premiership 2022 and for Glasgow in the SGB Championship 2022.

In 2023, he returned to the Edinburgh Monarchs for the SGB Championship 2023, he had previously been with them from 2011 to 2015.

References 

1987 births
Living people
British speedway riders
English motorcycle racers
British Speedway Championship winners
Belle Vue Aces riders
Buxton Hitmen riders
Edinburgh Monarchs riders
Glasgow Tigers riders
King's Lynn Stars riders
Peterborough Panthers riders
Scunthorpe Saints riders
Sheffield Tigers riders
Workington Comets riders